Michael Robinson is an American automobile designer. In January 2014 he left the position of Brand and Design Director of Gruppo Bertone after its financial crises became obvious, to become the chief executive officer and design director of ED Design in Turin, Italy.

Previously, Robinson held the position of Design Director at Fiat and Lancia, and worked as a designer with Ford in Dearborn, Volvo in Gothenborg, Sweden, Open Design, Ghia, and Fiat in Torino, Italy. Several of his more prominent styling contributions have been the Ghia TSX-4 concept car, the Fiat Bravo/Brava, (1995 European Car of the Year), the Lancia Dialogos Concept Car, the Lancia Giubileo (Pope's personal limousine based on a stretch Thesis), the Lancia Thesis, the Lancia Nea Concept Car, the Lancia Ypsilon, the Fiat Ducato, the Bertone Alfa Romeo Pandion Concept Car, and the Bertone Jaguar B99 – B99 GT concept cars, the Bertone Nuccio concept car, the SUV BAIC C51X concept, the Aston Martin Jet 2 +2 One-off prototype, FAW Besturn X80 SUV (in production), BAIC Senova D50 sedan production, and BAIC Senova D60 Aero concept car. In addition, Robinson designed the Project Zero for AgustaWestland, which has made the first test flight in 2011, presented to the public in 2013 at the Le Bourget Air Show. Project Zero is a tiltrotor helicopter with dual rotors turning 90 degrees to create the world's most innovative VTOL. The aircraft is 100% electric, totally devoid of hydraulic components. Robinson's creative team in Bertone also designed the exterior and interior of the Frecciarossa 1000, the high-speed train for Trenitalia, built by Ansaldo Breda and Bombardier. It has a maximum speed of 400 km/h and entered service in 2015.

Background

At age 16, while studying architecture in High School in Kent, Washington, he discovered a poster of the Lancia Stratos Prototipo Zero by Bertone. He was so heavily influenced by that magnificent concept car that he decided to not only become a car designer but to emigrate to Torino, Italy where the best car design in the world was taking place. He received bachelor's degrees in both Fine Arts (1978) and in Industrial Design (1979) from the University of Washington.

Career

In 1978, Robinson spent the summer before his final year in college at the Ford Design Center in Dearborn, Michigan, doing a student internship. The 150 professional designers working there were some of the most talented people he had ever met, but were forced to design the most horrible cars. Designers in Detroit in the 70's suffered heavily from the 1973 oil crisis which transformed the powerful, American muscle car era of the 60's into the absolute worst periods in the 100 years of car design history. With his heart set on the creative freedom of the Italian coachbuilder world, Robinson returned to college in Seattle heavily disillusioned and vowed to never work in America again as a car designer.

A year later, after graduation, he set out to visit every single automobile manufacturer in Europe, with the goal of comparing German, French, British, even Swedish design to his beloved Italian design. Thanks to the Frankfurt Auto Show, Robinson was able to obtain the business cards of every design director in every company across Europe. Each visit was a fascinating experience, especially after spending time in Ford in Dearborn. There were no American designers working in Europe at the time so everyone was curious to know more about why he was the only one travelling around looking for a job.

When he finally arrived in Italy, he found his dream come true, visiting coachbuilders like Bertone, Pininfarina, and Italdesign, and manufacturers like Ferrari, Lamborghini, and Maserati. He accepted a job as a designer at a tiny design studio called Open Design run by Aldo Sessano, designing cars, trucks, buses, and industrial design projects. A year later he decided to open his own freelance studio, working primarily for Renault. In 1983 he moved to Ghia, Ford's Italian design center, where he created his first concept car, the Ford Ghia Vignale TSX-4, a forerunner for the Ford Taurus station wagon design.

An American designer friend, Chris Bangle, had been working at Opel design in Germany as an interior designer and was nominated Exterior Design Chief at Fiat. He called Robinson to come to Fiat to help him reorganize the Fiat design process. Robinson began his 19-year career at Fiat working in Advanced Design, where he created the first Virtual Reality room in Europe in 1988. He was nominated Interior Design Chief in 1992 and designed the interior of the Fiat Bravo/Brava which won the European Car of the Year award in 1995. Chris Bangle became the Design Director at Fiat, Walter De Silva was the Design Director at Alfa Romeo, and in 1996, Robinson became the Design Director at Lancia at age 40. His first concept car at Lancia was the 1998 Dialogos, a research vehicle for new luxury sedans exploring new concepts which are now quite common, such as perceived quality (as opposed to manufacturing quality) and flush sedan bumpers.

The Lancia Dialogos concept car was transformed into the 2002 Lancia Thesis production sedan. He was then nominated the Design Director at Fiat in 2001, where he designed Europe's best selling delivery van, the Fiat Ducato/Peugeot Boxer/Citroen Jumper.

Robinson is famous for his motivational abilities he calls “People Design”, transforming his design studios into talent farms where his designers not only create beautiful cars, but also grow faster and farther in their careers. Many of his young designers in Lancia back then are now important design directors around Europe:
 Flavio Manzoni – Ferrari Design Director
 Marco Tencone – Lancia, Alfa Romeo, and Maserati Design Director
 Marco Lambri – Piaggio Design Director
 Alessandro D’Ambrosio – Volkswagen Interbrand Design Director
 Roberto Giolito – Fiat Vice President Design
 Peter Jansen – Fiat Professional (tractors and trucks) Design Director

After his long career in Fiat, Robinson was called upon by Lilli Bertone to become the new Brand and Design Director at Bertone in 2009. His first concept car in Bertone was the 2010 Alfa Romeo Pandion which was designed to celebrate Alfas 100 year anniversary at the Geneva Auto Show. The Pandion (which is the scientific name for Osprey) is a radical 2+2 sports car with reverse-opening scissors doors which are 3.4 meters tall when fully opened. The car utilizes a novel “Skin and Frame” concept stemming from the two-part Alfa Romeo logo, which underlines the new, dynamic mix between the robust organic frame and the sensuous skin that covers it. Many of the components in the car were realized using Algorithm Design technology, a random form generator which allows forms to become much more complex compared to those designed by humans.

The second concept car from Robinson and Bertone was called the 2011 Jaguar B99 (Bertone turned 99 years old on this year) and demonstrated the exact opposite in design directions compared to the flamboyant Pandion. The B99 was a highly sophisticated yet compact luxury sedan that lead Jaguar into the BMW 3 Series and Mercedes C-Class market with a new proportions called: “dynamic imbalance” which offer a perfect mix, lost some time ago by Jaguar designers, between "modernity" and the "brand DNA".

In 2012, Bertone presented their centennial concept car appropriately called the Bertone Nuccio, to honor the man who has rewritten car design history several times. The Nuccio is again a supercar like the Pandion, this time a classic two seater, mid-engine sports car with a 500 hp 8-cylinder Ferrari engine. The aggressive lines are a mix between the icons of the past such as the Stratos Zero and a decidedly futuristic look. The roof without a rear window denotes the arrival of the digital era, replacing the backlight with external cameras and internal screens. The orange color on the roof is Nuccio Bertone's favorite color, widely used throughout the Bertone Design Center. Another concept car developed simultaneously that year was the Chinese concept SUV called the BAIC C51X, the sister of the BAIC Senova D50 sedan designed by Bertone and launched into production at the 2014 Beijing Auto Show. The C51X is compact, dynamic, and extremely modern, and the success it had at the 2012 Beijing Auto Show convinced BAIC top management to put it into production.

In 2013 Robinson designed the Aston Martin Jet 2+2, a "one-off" prototype, ordered directly by private British client. The car was born as an Aston Martin Rapide, then transformed into a Shooting brake, preserving the original beauty of the spectacular Rapide. The Shooting brake formula must never be confused with the common Station Wagon, since the former is a station wagon "coupe" while the latter is a "cargo" station wagon, with very different proportions . The interior was highly refined, according to the requests of the private client, adding an innovative mobile platform to make better use of the rear compartment.

In China the FAW Besturn X80 SUV was launched officially, being the very first car designed by Robinson in China. Since its launch, sales have continued to grow and the car is now considered a giant success in the market.

At the end of 2013, Bertone closed dramatically, after 101 years of spectacular contributions to the world of car design. The 160 employees were sent home overnight, and all client projects were cancelled. Robinson's high school dreams from Kent, Washington were shattered, as the development activities inside Bertone continued to grow and prosper. "They took the floor out from under our feet," says Robinson, "the people responsible for this should be hung from a tree."

But after the anger, creativity returned, and Robinson decided to enter into partnership with David Pizzorno, founder of ED, a company with twenty years of experience in the field of automotive engineering and beyond. A small group of former Bertone employees followed Robinson into the new company, which now has nearly 400 full-time employees. Projects continue to arrive from new clients and Robinson is busy hiring young talents from all over the world to meet the workload. Designers, engineers, CAS modelers, and physical modelers are all needed, after opening on December 31, 2013 . The very first concept car produced by ED Design was exhibited at the 2014 Beijing Auto Show, in less than 4 months after the opening of the new ED Design department. The prototype is called BAIC Senova D60 Aero, a "GT" version of a standard sedan, which will be launched later this year. Given the extremely short timeframe, the prototype was built in China, followed directly by Robinson himself, in order to ensure the same quality level he expects from all his projects. The car was one of the stars at the Beijing Auto Show, acclaimed by journalists and young visitors. Robinson was invited by BAIC to present the world premiere of Senova D50, a car he designed months ago while he was the Director of Design at Bertone, finally unveiled to the public for the first time.

In 2011, Robinson was inducted into the Hall of Fame of car design at the National Automobile Museum of Turin, Italy. Now, between continuous trips to China and continuous developments in the office in Italy, Robinson is highly requested as a key-note speaker at worldwide innovation conferences, illustrating the future of the automobile in the digital age. His vision is based on the concrete fact that according to World Health Organization (WHO) statistics, every year 1.2 million people die in car accidents, thus being the eighth leading cause of death in the world. An endless war that continues to increase as the growth of car per capita in countries of strong growth such as China. If things do not change, in 2020 the number of annual deaths could double. The solution is “simple”, just remove the steering wheel, transforming every vehicle into an "auto" (for autonomous) "mobile" (for moving vehicles). The famous "Google cars" are widely acclaimed in the mass media, but by law must maintain the original steering wheel of the original car This is just in case the electronic gadgets that they attached to the car should fail. Too bad, because by doing so, they cannot exploit the automotive architectural opportunities of modern digital technology. Autonomous cars will no longer need steering wheels, pedals, or gear shifters, because no humans will be driving them, only a digital chauffeur. The problem for designers will soon be: how to recover the lost love story between people and their cars when driving becomes illegal. Anyone who loves cars today loves to drive them, and when this is no longer possible, they won't love them any more. So to recreate the magnetic attraction between the man and the autonomous car, designers have to come up with something even more spectacular, using special effects seen today only in science fiction films. In the future, technological advances will make these concepts feasible, and cars will regain their emotional excitement using digital excitement rather than form excitement today. Robinson explains that this new profession is called "Experiential Design", or designing experiences rather than objects. The digital era is changing many things in our lives, including the business of design. According to Robinson's friend Alan Kay, the inventor of the personal computer: "The best way to predict the future, is to invent it. "

References 

1) Thompson, Rufus. "Who's Where: Michael Robinson departs Bertone for ED Design". designnews.com. Car Design News Ltd. Archived from the original on 4 April 2014. Retrieved 1 April 2014.
2) Luca Ciferri (2011-03-25). "French car – with Italian ties – is tops with 6 famous designers and 1 humble reporter". Autonews.com. Retrieved 2011-10-23.
3) Patton, Phil https://www.nytimes.com/2011/05/01/automobiles/01BERTONE.html (2011-04-29). "Wedges of influence from Bertone". nytimes.com. 
4) Patton, Phil (2011-04-13). "MIKE ROBINSON - Wheels Blog - NYTimes.com". nytimes.com. Retrieved 2011-10-23.
5) "The Last Italian Design House - Automobile Magazine". Automobilemag.com. Retrieved 2011-10-23.
6) Patton, Phil (2011-02-24). "Geneva Auto Show: Jaguar B99 Concept - NYTimes.com". Geneva (Switzerland): Wheels.blogs.nytimes.com. Retrieved 2011-10-23.
7) "Geneva Auto Show: Bertone Pandion - NYTimes.com". Wheels.blogs.nytimes.com. 2010-03-02. Retrieved 2011-10-23.
8) "Bertone Design Director Michael Robinson takes us on a visual tour of the B99 concept interior". Cdnlive.cardesignnews.com. 2011-03-23. Retrieved 2011-10-23.
9) "Bertone Jaguar B99 - By Design - Automobile Magazine". Automobilemag.com. Retrieved 2011-10-23.
10) https://www.automotivespace.it/eng/mike-robinson-interview-with-a-versatile-designer-1st-part/
11) https://www.automotivespace.it/eng/mike-robinson-interview-with-a-versatile-designer-2nd-part/
12) https://www.automotivespace.it/eng/mike-robinson-interview-with-a-versatile-designer-3rd-part/

External links 
 Bertone web site

American automobile designers
Gruppo Bertone
Living people
1956 births